The Ambassador of the Philippines to Japan is the Republic of the Philippines' foremost diplomatic representative in the State of Japan. As officer of the Philippine Department of Foreign Affairs, the head of the Embassy, and the head of the Philippines' diplomatic mission there, the Ambassador is the official representative of the President and the Government of the Philippines to the Emperor and Government of Japan. The position has the rank and status of an Ambassador Extraordinary and Plenipotentiary.

The ambassador is based at the embassy at 5 Chome-15-5, Roppongi, Minato City, Tokyo, Japan and resided in The Kudan, located in 1-1-1 Fujimi, Chiyoda-ku, Tokyo, Japan.

The position is currently held by Mylene Garcia-Albano since August 12, 2022.

History
The diplomatic relations between the two countries were established on October 14, 1943, following the inauguration of the Second Republic under the administration of President Jose P. Laurel and in the midst of the Second World War. Jorge B. Vargas, who was previously served as President Manuel L. Quezon's Secretary of National Defense and Executive Secretary, was appointed ambassador to the Empire of Japan after he declined to assume the Presidency under the Japanese occupation.

Following the defeat of Japan on September 2, 1945, relations were suspended and the post of the Philippine ambassador to the Japanese mainland became dormant until 1952 since the relations and credentials were redirected to the Supreme Commander for the Allied Powers in occupied Japan. In October 1952, the Japanese embassy in Manila was reestablished, pursuant to the Treaty of San Francisco that was signed on 8 September 1951 that would serve as a formal conclusion of the Second World War. On July 23, 1956, right after the ratification of the Peace Treaty and Reparations Agreement between the Philippines and Japan (signed on 9 May 1956), the diplomatic relations between the two countries were fully reinstated and the post of the Philippine ambassador to the Japanese mainland was re-established.

List of ambassadors to Japan

See also
Japan–Philippines relations
List of ambassadors of Japan to the Philippines
The Kudan
Foreign relations of the Philippines
Foreign relations of Japan

References

External links
Primary and official website of the Embassy of the Philippines, Tokyo
Secondary/Alternate website of the Embassy of the Philippines, Tokyo

 
Philippines
Japan